Joe Varde (born April 3, 1950) is an American road racer. A five-time International Motor Sports Association champion, he has also made a few starts in NASCAR competition, including racing in the Sprint Cup Series for BACE Motorsports in 2002 at Watkins Glen International. He is currently crew chief for Rum Bum Racing in the Grand-Am Continental Tire Sports Car Challenge.

Motorsports career results

NASCAR
(key) (Bold - Pole position awarded by qualifying time. Italics - Pole position earned by points standings or practice time. * – Most laps led.)

Winston Cup Series

Busch Series

Craftsman Truck Series

References

External links
 

Living people
1950 births
Racing drivers from Tampa, Florida
24 Hours of Daytona drivers
American Le Mans Series drivers
IMSA GT Championship drivers
NASCAR drivers